Gardenia psidioides is a species of plant in the family Rubiaceae native to northeastern Australia.

References

psidioides
Endemic flora of Queensland
Taxa named by Christopher Francis Puttock